Anon may refer to:

Arts and media 
 Anon (album), a 2018 album by Hands Like Houses
 Anon (film), a 2018 British science fiction thriller film
 Anon (band)

People with the given name 
 Anon Amornlerdsak (born 1997), a Thai footballer
 Anon Boonsukco (born 1978), a professional footballer from Thailand
 Anon Nampa, Thai human rights activist
 Anon Nanok (born 1983), a football Defender from Thailand
 Anon San-Mhard (born 1991), a Thai footballer
 Anon Sangsanoi (born 1984), a Thai footballer

Places 
 Anón, a barrio of Ponce, Puerto Rico
 Añón de Moncayo, a municipality in the province of Zaragoza, Aragon, Spain
 Anones, a barrio of Naranjito, Puerto Rico
 Río Anón, a river in Ponce, Puerto Rico

Other uses 
 An anonymous person
An online post made by such a person (see anonymous post)
 Anonymous (group), an internet movement and group
 Bol-anon, the Boholano people of the island province of Bohol, Philippines

See also 
 Annon, a surname
 Annona, a genus of flowering plants in the pawpaw/sugar apple family, "Annonaceae"
 Anonymous (disambiguation)